Sharaf DG is a Dubai Metro station name derived from a UAE retailer that has been used for two stations in Dubai, United Arab Emirates (UAE):

 Mashreq (Dubai Metro) (until 18 May 2020)
 Al Fahidi (Dubai Metro) (since 24 November 2020)

References